Palestinian Child's Day (The day on which Palestinian children celebrate in the Occupied State of Palestine, on 5 April of each year.

Date of celebration
The declaration of International Children's Day came when the late President Yasser Arafat declared his commitment to the Convention on the Rights of the Child, whereby Yasser Arafat declared 5 April a day for the Palestinian child. Note that the official ratification of the State of Palestine on the International Convention on the Rights of the Child was on 2 April 2014.

The legal status of children in Palestine
There are general laws in the State of Palestine pertaining to the Palestinian child, such as the Palestinian Child Law No. (7) for the year 2004 AD and the decision by Law No. (4) for the year 2016 AD regarding the protection of juveniles, as these laws codify and limit the laws pertaining to the child with the aim of protecting him.

Children in the Israeli-Palestinian Conflict

Children in the Israeli-Palestinian conflict refer to the impact of the Israeli-Palestinian conflict on minors in the Palestinian territories.
Philip E. Verman found in an academic study that the IDF's response against Palestinian children was so strong that it "practically eliminates opportunities for effective child protection training." So that many children are brought up in refugee camps, and Daoud Kuttab described their conditions in the following way:

Violence against children
Every year, approximately 700 Palestinian children between the ages of 12 and 17, the vast majority of whom are male, are arrested, interrogated, and detained by the Israeli army, Israeli police and Arabized forces.

Photo Gallery

See also

Land Day
International Day of Solidarity with the Palestinian People
Nakba Day
Children's Day

References

Public holidays in the State of Palestine
April observances